Cavilucina is a genus of bivalves in the family Lucinidae.

Overview of species 
 Cavilucina citrina (Angas, 1879)
 Cavilucina fieldingi (H. Adams, 1871)
 Cavilucina pamela (Melvill & Standen, 1907)

 Fossil species
 †Cavilucina elegans Fischer, 1887 (Lutetian of France)
 †Cavilucina (Cavilucina) sulcata (Lamarck, 1806)
 †Cavilucina (Mesomiltha) bellona d'Orbigny 1850
 †Cavilucina (Mesomiltha) orbignyana d'Archiac 1843
 †Cavilucina (Mesomiltha) subgeometrica Fischer 1969

 Names brought to synonymy
 †Cavilucina elegans (Deshayes, 1823), a synonym of Fimbria soverbii (Reeve, 1842).

References

External links 
 
 
 Cavilucina elegans at the World Mollusc Species Data base

Bivalve genera
Lucinidae